I'm a Celebrity...Get Me Out of Here! is a British reality TV series in which a number of celebrities live  together in a jungle environment for a number of weeks, competing to be crowned "King" or "Queen of the Jungle".

The show was originally created in the United Kingdom by Granada Television and produced by its subsidiary, ITV's then London franchise London Weekend Television (LWT) and developed by a team including James Allen, Natalka Znak, Brent Baker and Stewart Morris. The first episode aired on 25 August 2002 hosted by Anthony McPartlin and Declan Donnelly, also known as Ant and Dec. It is now produced by ITV Studios and has been licensed globally to countries including the United States, Germany, France, Hungary, Sweden, the Netherlands, Denmark, Romania, Russia, Australia and India.

Filming location

The UK, German and the 2003 US versions of the series take place in New South Wales, Australia, at a permanently-built up camp and filming studios on a disused banana plantation facility called Dungay Creek in Dungay near Murwillumbah. However the first UK series of the show (aired in 2002) was filmed on a smaller site close to King Ranch (officially El Rancho del Rey) in Kooroomool, near Tully, Queensland, in Australia.

The leaseholder of the privately owned Dungay site is the British production company ITV Studios, formerly Granada Television, which extensively redesigned and built on the previously open site and equipped it with camera and sound technology for TV broadcasting. About 600 mostly Australian crew members, including 136 from the UK, are involved in the yearly production and in excess of 100 cameras are used. Inside the entrance to the filming location is an open area allocated to buildings which accommodate on-site medical facilities, containers for the storage of props, and other backstage facilities. Families and friends of the celebrities are housed here each morning during evictions. A restricted access road ascends to the location of the studios from this area. The four-wheel drive access to the show's set then descends into a valley.

In August 2020, it was confirmed that due to the COVID-19 pandemic and related travel restrictions, the 20th UK series would be filmed in Gwrych Castle in Abergele, North Wales. Due to the COVID-19 pandemic, the 15th season of the German version, was originally planned for 2021 to take place for the first time in the history of the show not in Australia, but in North Wales, at Gwrych Castle. On 22 October 2020, it was announced that production in Wales was cancelled and that broadcaster RTL was working on a new concept. On 2 August 2021, it was announced that, due to Australia's border remaining closed amid COVID-19 restrictions in the country, filming for the UK version would again be taking place at Gwrych Castle in Abergele, Wales. As part of the agreement with Gwrych Castle Preservation Trust, ITV announced it would continue to help support the ongoing restoration project of the site.

The Australian series is usually filmed in Blyde River Canyon near Hoedspruit and Kruger National Park, in South Africa. The seventh season however was pre-recorded in Australia during late 2020 at the site used by the British and German versions since 2003. On 18 October 2021, it was announced by RTL that the German version would now be filmed at the same location in South Africa instead of its usual home in Australia, taking the filming slot previously occupied by the Australian version. In September 2022, it was confirmed that ITV would pre-record a special "All-Stars" series in South Africa, featuring former campmates and scheduled to air in 2023. 

Other versions of the show have been filmed in Argentina, Brazil, Columbia, Costa Rica, the Dominican Republic, Suriname, Indonesia and Malaysia.

Criticism
This series has been criticised by Tessa Jowell, at the time the Secretary of State for Culture, Media and Sport. In an interview with the Financial Times during the second UK series, she said, "If they weren't mostly – save their blushes – has-been celebrities, there might be more interest ... I think that if we saw many more programming hours taken over by reality TV, I hope you'd begin to see a viewers' revolt."

In 2002, CBS, broadcaster of the popular American reality show Survivor, unsuccessfully sued ABC and Granada TV over a planned American version of I'm a Celebrity... Get Me Out of Here!, alleging similarities.

The show's use of live insects and other living creatures in the bushtucker trials has led to some public criticism of the show and its producers and those involved in the programming. This issue was highlighted during the 2009 UK series, where celebrity chef Gino D'Acampo killed, cooked and ate a rat. The RSPCA Australia investigated the incident and sought to prosecute D'Acampo and actor Stuart Manning for animal cruelty after this episode of the show was aired. ITV was fined but the two celebrities involved were not prosecuted for animal cruelty despite being charged with the offence by the New South Wales Police. This incident did, however, highlight among certain groups such as Buglife, a British charity for the conservation of insects, and the RSPCA, the controversy surrounding the killing of living creatures for human entertainment.

There has been criticism that the producers present the celebrities as living in a "dangerous" jungle, despite the fact that they are actually kept in a controlled environment, with some of the scenery being artificial, e.g. a pond and a small waterfall.

In November 2014, TV presenter Chris Packham wrote an open letter to Ant & Dec asking them and ITV to end the "abuse of animals" in I'm A Celebrity... Get Me Out of Here!. He described the trials as "out of date" and "silly". Packham again requested that the programme end its perceived animal abuse on stage during the 2019 TV Choice Awards, whilst imploring celebrities and those in the television industry to be more conscious of the environment.

In January 2021, the Australian version of the reality show received criticism for its "sick', "traumatic" and "unnecessary" content when a contestant was bitten by a snake in an episode.

In November 2022, the British ITV show returned to its original jungle setting in Australia, from Wales (2021) where both ITV and one of the contestants Matt Hancock, a serving MP (the former Health Secretary who was forced to resign his Cabinet Post) was criticised over his inclusion in the reality programme, with viewers reportedly complaining to Ofcom that the MP should be at work in Westminster and his Constituency in Suffolk, instead of gaining financial rewards after past indiscretions and breaking Covid-19 guidelines, ITV reportedly paid Hancock £400,000 to participate.

International versions

Notes

References

External links

 
Television series by ITV Studios
Television series featuring gunge